Joseph Miller (27 April 1899–unknown) was an Irish footballer who played in the Football League for Aberdare Athletic, Bournemouth & Boscombe Athletic and Middlesbrough.

References

1899 births
Association football midfielders
English Football League players
Pre-1950 IFA international footballers
Association footballers from Northern Ireland
Largs Thistle F.C. players
Port Glasgow Athletic F.C. players
Greenock Morton F.C. players
Arthurlie F.C. players
Johnstone F.C. players
Nuneaton Borough F.C. players
Aberdare Athletic F.C. players
Middlesbrough F.C. players
Dolphin F.C. players
Hibernian F.C. players
Ards F.C. players
AFC Bournemouth players
Ross County F.C. players
Year of death missing